Goubbiah, mon amour is a French romance drama film from 1956, directed by Robert Darène, written by René Barjavel, starring Jean Marais. The scenario was based on a novel of Jean Martet. The film was known under the title Cita en el Sol (Spain), Kiss of Fire (UK), and Liebe unter heißem Himmel (West Germany).

Cast 
 Jean Marais : Goubbiah
 Kerima : Carola
 Delia Scala : Trinida
 Charles Moulin : Jao – Trinida's Father
 Henri Nassiet : Goubbiah's Father
 Gil Delamare : Peppo – Trinida's Fiancée
 Marie-José Darène : Minnie
 Henri Cogan : The Scarface
 Louis Bugette : Erika

References

External links 
 
 Goubbiah, mon amour (1956) at the Films de France

1956 films
French romantic drama films
1950s French-language films
French black-and-white films
Films directed by Robert Darène
1956 romantic drama films
Fictional representations of Romani people
Films scored by Joseph Kosma
Films with screenplays by René Barjavel
1950s French films